Sheldon Lowell Rittmer (September 5, 1928 – November 21, 2015) was an American politician in the state of Iowa.

Rittmer was born in Clinton County, Iowa. He is a farmer. He served in the Iowa State Senate from 1991 to 2003, as a Republican. He died in 2015 in Bettendorf, Iowa from a Zenker's diverticulum.

References

1928 births
2015 deaths
People from Clinton County, Iowa
Farmers from Iowa
Republican Party Iowa state senators